Robert Murray Hanson (February 4, 1920 – February 3, 1944) was a United States Marine Corps flying ace who shot down 25 Japanese planes from the South Pacific skies. He posthumously received the Medal of Honor. One of five children, he is the elder brother of Edith Hanson and Earl Dorchester Hanson.

Early years
Robert M. Hanson was the son of Methodist missionaries who served for several decades in India. In Lucknow, India, his playmates were Hindu children.  He attended an American-run missionary school, Woodstock School, in Mussoorie in the Western Indian Himalayas, along with his siblings, Mark, Stanley,  Earl Hanson, and Edith Hanson. After attending junior high school in the United States, he returned to India to become light-heavyweight and heavy-weight wrestling champion of the United Provinces of Agra and Oudh, at the time a large province in northern India.  In his honor, the sports field at his alma mater Woodstock School in the Indian Himalayas is still named Hanson Field.

World War II

In the spring of 1938, on his way back to the United States to attend college, he bicycled his way through Europe and was in Vienna during the Anschluss. He was attending Hamline University, St. Paul, Minnesota, at the time of the attack on Pearl Harbor. He enlisted for naval flight training in May 1942 and earned his wings and a Marine Corps commission as a second lieutenant on February 19, 1943, in Corpus Christi, Texas.

First Lieutenant Hanson arrived in the South Pacific in June 1943 and his daring tactics and total disregard for death soon became well known.  A master of individual air combat, he downed 20 enemy planes in six consecutive flying days. He was commended in the citation accompanying the Medal of Honor for his bold attack against six enemy torpedo bombers, November 1, 1943, over Bougainville Island, and for bringing down four Zeros, the premier Japanese fighter, while fighting them alone over New Britain, January 24, 1944.

A member of VMF-215 flying the F4U-1 Corsair, the ace was shot down twice. The first time, a Zero caught him over Bougainville Island. Bringing his plane down on the ocean, he paddled for six hours in a rubber life raft before being rescued by the USS Sigourney (DD-643). His second and fatal crash occurred one day before his twenty-fourth birthday. He was last seen on February 3, 1944, when his plane crashed into the sea after a cancelled (due to overcast) fighter sweep mission over Rabaul, New Britain. He was attempting to destroy a lighthouse on Cape St. George, Southern New Ireland, that often gave the fighter group trouble by firing flak at the fighter group as they passed the lighthouse. His squadron leader Capt. Harold L. Spears watched as he attempted to land his damaged plane in the water during rough seas. His plane cart wheeled when one of the wings grabbed a wave and the plane disintegrated. He had no time to escape the cockpit, thus sank with his plane. He was subsequently declared killed in action. He has cenotaph memorials at Manila, Philippines and Newton, Massachusetts.

The Medal of Honor was presented to the lieutenant's mother by Maj. Gen. Lewie G. Merritt on August 19, 1944, in Boston, Massachusetts.

Awards and decorations

Medal of Honor citation

The President of the United States takes pleasure in presenting the MEDAL OF HONOR to

for service as set forth in the following CITATION:

For conspicuous gallantry and intrepidity at the risk of his life above and beyond the call of duty as a fighter pilot attached to Marine Fighting Squadron TWO FIFTEEN in action against Japanese forces at Bougainville Islands, November 1, 1943, and New Britain Island, January 24, 1944. Undeterred by fierce opposition and fearless in the face of overwhelming odds, First Lieutenant Hanson fought the Japanese boldly and with daring aggressiveness. On November 1, while flying cover for our landing operations at Empress Augusta Bay, he dauntlessly attacked six enemy torpedo bombers, forcing them to jettison their bombs and destroying one Japanese plane during the action. Cut off from his division while deep in enemy territory during a high cover flight over Simpson Harbor on January 24, First Lieutenant Hanson waged a lone and gallant battle against hostile interceptors as they were orbiting to attack our bombers and, striking with devastating fury, brought down four Zeros and probably a fifth. Handling his plane superbly in both pursuit and attack measures, he was a master of individual air combat, accounting for a total of 25 Japanese aircraft in this theater of war. His great personal valor and invincible fighting spirit were in keeping with the highest traditions of the United States Naval Service.

/S/ FRANKLIN ROOSEVELT

Navy Cross citation
Citation:
The President of the United States of America takes pleasure in presenting the Navy Cross to First Lieutenant Robert Murray Hanson (MCSN: 0-19154), United States Marine Corps Reserve, for extraordinary heroism and distinguished service in the line of his profession as Pilot of a Fighter Plane attached to Marine Fighting Squadron TWO HUNDRED FIFTEEN (VMF-215), Marine Air Group FOURTEEN (MAG-14), FIRST Marine Aircraft Wing, in aerial combat against enemy Japanese forces in the Solomon Islands Area from 5 January 1944 to 3 February 1944. Intercepted by a superior number of Japanese fighters while covering a flight of our bombers in a strike against enemy shipping in Simpson harbor on 14 January, First Lieutenant Hanson boldly engaged the hostile planes in fierce combat, pressing home repeated attacks with devastating force. Separated from his squadron during the intense action, he valiantly continued the engagement alone, successfully destroying five enemy Zeros before being forced by lack of ammunition and gasoline to return to his base. First Lieutenant Hanson's superb airmanship, brilliant initiative and dauntless fighting spirit enabled our bombers to deliver a crushing blow to the Japanese in that sector and return safe to their base and his conduct throughout was in keeping with the highest traditions of the United States Naval Service.

See also
United States Marine Corps aviation
List of Medal of Honor recipients

References
Inline

General

Bibliography

Web

1920 births
1944 deaths
United States Marine Corps personnel killed in World War II
American World War II flying aces
Aviators killed by being shot down
Hamline University alumni
United States Marine Corps Medal of Honor recipients
Recipients of the Navy Cross (United States)
Recipients of the Air Medal
United States Naval Aviators
United States Marine Corps officers
United States Marine Corps pilots of World War II
World War II recipients of the Medal of Honor
Aviators killed in aviation accidents or incidents